The Brack Report is a British television drama series created by Christopher Penfold for Thames Television looking at concerns about nuclear power, and exploring some alternative energy sources. It was broadcast over 10 weeks on ITV from 6 April 1982 to 8 June 1982 which overlapped with the Falklands War. It stars Donald Sumpter, Patricia Garwood and Jenny Seagrove.

Plot
After an earthquake causes some damage to a nuclear power station, one of the chief nuclear physicists, Paul Brack, starts to investigate the safety procedures and policies of the station. He is dismayed to discover that there is a lack of real safety processes at the station, and quits his job in disgust. His disillusionment puts a strain on his relationship with his wife, Pat, a fellow researcher and academic. 

Through a mutual friend, Brack meets and begins to work for energy consultant Harold Harlan, with hopes that Harlan can highlight the issue of nuclear safety, and explore alternative energy sources. Unfortunately Harlan has his own plans for how he can use Brack.

Cast

Main cast
 Donald Sumpter as Paul Brack
 Patricia Garwood as Pat Brack
 Jenny Seagrove as Angela Brack
 Neil Nisbet as Oliver Brack
 Robert Lang as Harold Harlan
 Toria Fuller as Sophie Ferris
 Sue Robinson as Sarah Challen
 Antony Carrick as Norman Phillips
 Tom Chadbon as Brian Fletcher

Guest cast
 Geoffrey Beevers as Dr. Scheer
 Graham Crowden as Max Challen
 T.P. McKenna as Frank Clements
 Daniel Massey as Andrei Tchenkov
 Judy Parfitt as Ella Smitherson
 Tony Steedman as Dr. Smitherson
 Wanda Ventham as Kate Randall
 Jerome Willis as John Robertson

Episodes

Production

Writing
The show's creator, Christopher Penfold, was previously a writer on Space: 1999 (a show where a nuclear accident on the Moon causes it to be knocked out of orbit), and he developed The Brack Report as a means of exploring and dramatizing some of the challenges of nuclear power, as well as looking at some of the alternative ways of generating energy.

Music
The theme tune was composed by Christopher Gunning, who had been composing music for film and TV for twelve years when he completed this piece. Other notable work by Gunning includes the themes for Rogue Male (1976), The Day of the Triffids (1981), Porterhouse Blue (1987), Under Suspicion (1991), Lighthouse Hill (2004), and La Vie en rose (2007).

Filming
Filming of the series took over a year to complete. Geoffrey Beevers, who played Dr. Scheer in Episodes 4 and 7, had to be excused from filming on 17 December 1980 to shoot scenes for the Doctor Who serial "The Keeper of Traken" which had been delayed due to an electricians strike.

Some exterior scenes for Episode 7 were filmed in Tynemouth, including at Tynemouth Castle and Priory. Some exterior scenes for Episode 9 were filmed at the Rance Tidal Power Station in Brittany, France. Some interior scenes were filmed at Pinewood Studios.

Broadcast
 : It was originally broadcast on ITV in 1982
 : In 1983 it was shown on Australian TV Channel 3
 : In 1983–1984 it was broadcast on ARD
  (again): In 2020 it was broadcast by Talking Pictures TV

Reception

Creator Christopher Penfold commented that the transmission of the series (6 April to 8 June 1982) "got absolutely swamped by the Falklands War" (2 April to 14 June 1982), and that the show "would have created a much bigger public stir" had it not been for that war.

Episode One was referred to the Broadcasting Complaints Commission by the Central Electricity Generating Board. The UK Atomic Energy Authority also expressed their concerns over the series.

A contemporary review by Lucy Hughes-Hallett, writing in The Times, noted that the weighty subject-matter made for a ponderous narrative: "artistically…not a great success" but allowed that it was "an…intelligent attempt to tackle a difficult subject". Another contemporary review by Chris Dunkley of the Financial Times noted that the show was being broadcast in the same slot that had been previously occupied by drama series Muck and Brass (starring Mel Smith), and he felt those shows were evidence that ITV have a "sane and admirable new policy of creating modern drama series dealing with contemporary themes".

In other media

Books
A 192-page novelization of "The Brack Report", written by Patrick Winter, was released on 15 March 1982 by Arrow Books publishers.

See also
The Day After Tomorrow, a 1975 television drama set in a future where environmental damage on threatens the survival of humanity.
 The China Syndrome, a 1979 American drama film concerning safety coverups at a nuclear power plant.
 The Chain Reaction, a 1980 Australian thriller film about an engineer who tries to warm the public about possible nuclear waste
 Dark Circle, a 1982 American documentary on the connections between the nuclear weapons and the nuclear power industries.
 Silkwood, a 1983 American biographical film of nuclear whistleblower and labour union activist Karen Silkwood.
 The Day After, a 1983 American television film exploring a potential nuclear exchange between the United States and the Soviet Union.
 Threads, a 1984 drama television film about nuclear war and its effects on the city of Sheffield in Northern England.

References

External links
 
 "The Brack Report screencaps
 TV Times interview with Donald Sumpter, April 1982
The Brack Report on The Radio Times
 BFI: The Brack Report Chapter 1 (1982)
 RosterCon.com: The Brack Report

1982 British television series debuts
1982 British television series endings
1980s British drama television series
1980s British television miniseries
English-language television shows
Nuclear energy in fiction
Nuclear power in the United Kingdom
ITV television dramas
Television series by Fremantle (company)
Television shows produced by Thames Television